Marshal of the Royal Air Force William Sholto Douglas, 1st Baron Douglas of Kirtleside,  (23 December 1893 – 29 October 1969) was a senior commander in the Royal Air Force. After serving as a pilot, then a flight commander and finally as a squadron commander during the First World War, he served as a flying instructor during the inter-war years before becoming Director of Staff Duties and then Assistant Chief of the Air Staff at the Air Ministry.

During the Second World War Douglas clashed with other senior commanders over strategy in the Battle of Britain. Douglas argued for a more aggressive engagement with a 'Big Wing' strategy i.e. using massed fighters to defend the United Kingdom against enemy bombers. He then became  Air Officer Commanding-in-Chief of Fighter Command in which role he was responsible for rebuilding the command's strength after the attrition of the Battle of Britain, but also for bringing it on the offensive to wrest the initiative in the air from the German Luftwaffe.

Douglas went on to be Air Officer Commanding in Chief of RAF Middle East Command in which role he was an advocate of Operation Accolade, a planned British amphibious assault on Rhodes and the Dodecanese Islands in the Aegean Sea, and was disappointed when it was abandoned. He became commander of the British Zone of Occupation in Germany after the war.

From 1949 to 1964 he served as chairman of British European Airways.

Early life
Born the son of Professor Robert Langton Douglas and his wife Margaret Jane Douglas (née Cannon), Douglas was educated at Emanuel School, Tonbridge School and Lincoln College, Oxford.

Early military career
Douglas was commissioned as a second lieutenant in the Royal Field Artillery on 15 August 1914. In January 1915, following a disagreement with his commanding officer, he transferred to the Royal Flying Corps joining No. 2 Squadron as an observer. He soon trained as a pilot and earned Royal Aero Club certificate No 1301. Promoted to lieutenant on 9 June 1915, he became a pilot with  No. 14 Squadron at Shoreham in July 1915 and then transferred to No. 8 Squadron, flying B.E.2c aircraft on the Western Front, in August 1915. Appointed a flight commander with the rank of temporary captain in December 1915, he joined No. 18 Squadron at Montrose in January 1916. He was awarded the Military Cross on 14 January 1916.

Douglas went on to be officer commanding No. 43 Squadron, flying Sopwith 1½ Strutters on the Western Front, in April 1916 and, having been promoted to temporary major on 1 July 1916, he became then officer commanding No. 84 Squadron, flying S.E.5s on the Western Front, in August 1917. He was awarded the Distinguished Flying Cross on 8 February 1919.

After the war Douglas worked briefly for Handley Page and as a commercial pilot before rejoining the Royal Air Force in 1920 after a chance meeting with Hugh Trenchard. After being granted a permanent commission as a squadron leader on 25 March 1920, Douglas attended the RAF Staff College and then served as a flight instructor four years. Promoted to wing commander on 1 January 1925, he continued his work as an instructor before attending the Imperial Defence College in 1927. He became station commander at RAF North Weald in January 1928 and then joined the Air Staff at Headquarters Middle East Command in Khartoum in August 1929. Promoted to group captain on 1 January 1932, he became an instructor at the Imperial Defence College in June 1932 and then, having been promoted to air commodore on 1 January 1935, he became Director of Staff Duties at the Air Ministry on 1 January 1936. Promoted to air vice marshal on 1 January 1938, he went on to be Assistant Chief of the Air Staff on 17 February 1938.

Second World War

On 22 April 1940, with the Second World War well under way, he was made Deputy Chief of the Air Staff. He was appointed a Companion of the Order of the Bath on 11 July 1940. During 1940, Douglas and Trafford Leigh-Mallory clashed with the head of No. 11 Group, Keith Park, and the head of Fighter Command, Hugh Dowding, over strategy in the Battle of Britain. Douglas argued for a more aggressive engagement with a 'Big Wing' strategy i.e. using massed fighters to defend the United Kingdom against enemy bombers. When Charles Portal was made Chief of the Air Staff in October 1940 he supported Douglas, moving Park and Dowding and appointing Douglas to replace Dowding as Air Officer Commanding-in-Chief of Fighter Command, with the temporary rank of air marshal on 25 November 1940. He was advanced to Knight Commander of the Order of the Bath on 1 July 1941 and promoted to the substantive rank of air marshal on 14 April 1942.

At around this time Prime Minister Winston Churchill recommended Douglas to command the China Burma India Theater but General George C. Marshall, the U.S. Army Chief of Staff, refused to accept the appointment due to Douglas's well known dislike of Americans.

As commander-in-chief of Fighter Command, Douglas was responsible for rebuilding the command's strength after the attrition of the Battle of Britain, but also for bringing it on the offensive to wrest the initiative in the air from the German Luftwaffe. He was therefore one of the main orchestrators of the only partially successful Circus offensive whereby large wings of fighters accompanied by bombers would take advantage of good weather to sweep over Northern France.

Douglas was promoted to temporary air chief marshal on 1 July 1942. On 28 November 1942 Douglas was replaced at Fighter Command by Trafford Leigh-Mallory and was transferred to Egypt, becoming Air Officer Commanding in Chief of RAF Middle East Command in January 1943. In that capacity Douglas was an advocate of Operation Accolade, a planned British amphibious assault on Rhodes and the Dodecanese Islands in the Aegean Sea, and was disappointed when it was abandoned.

Douglas returned to England in January 1944 to head Coastal Command during the invasion of Normandy and then, having been confirmed in the rank of air chief marshal on 6 June 1945, he became Commander in Chief, British Air Forces of Occupation in July 1945. He was advanced to Knight Grand Cross of the Order of the Bath on 1 January 1946.

Promoted to Marshal of the Royal Air Force on 1 January 1946, Douglas became the second commander of the British Zone of Occupation in Germany in May 1946. He was raised to the peerage as Baron Douglas of Kirtleside, of Dornock in the County of Dumfries on 17 February 1948, sitting as a member of the Labour Party. Douglas retired in 1947 and became chairman of BEA in 1949, a post he retained until 1964. He published two volumes of autobiography, Years of Combat, covering the First World War, and Years of Command covering the Second World War.

Douglas died in hospital in Northampton on 29 October 1969 and was buried at St Clement Danes in The Strand in London. He was an atheist.

Family
Lord Douglas of Kirtleside was married three times. First he married May Howard in October 1919; they were childless and divorced in 1932. Secondly he married Joan Leslie (née Denny) in 1933; this marriage was also childless and ended in divorce in 1952. Thirdly he married Hazel Walker in 1955; they had one daughter, Katharine.

Arms

Publications

References

Sources

External links

|-

|-

|-

|-

|-

1893 births
1969 deaths
Alumni of Lincoln College, Oxford
Graduates of the Royal College of Defence Studies
British atheists
British Army personnel of World War I
Chief Commanders of the Legion of Merit
Commanders with Star of the Order of Polonia Restituta
Commercial aviators
Deputy Lieutenants of the County of London
Foreign recipients of the Distinguished Service Medal (United States)
Graduates of the Royal Air Force College Cranwell
Grand Croix of the Légion d'honneur
Grand Crosses of the Order of the Phoenix (Greece)
Grand Officers of the Order of the Crown (Belgium)
Knights Grand Cross of the Order of Orange-Nassau
Knights Grand Cross of the Order of the Bath
Labour Party (UK) hereditary peers
Marshals of the Royal Air Force
People from Oxford
Burials in England
Recipients of the Croix de Guerre 1914–1918 (France)
Recipients of the Distinguished Flying Cross (United Kingdom)
Recipients of the Military Cross
Recipients of the Order of the White Lion
Royal Air Force air marshals of World War II
Royal Air Force personnel of World War I
Royal Artillery officers
Royal Flying Corps officers
Recipients of the Navy Distinguished Service Medal
Military personnel from Oxfordshire